The Tip of the Mitt AVA is an American Viticultural Area located in the northern Lower Peninsula of the U.S. state of Michigan. It includes all or part of Alpena, Antrim, Charlevoix, Cheboygan, Emmet, and Presque Isle counties. Active TOTM wineries are grouped around Petoskey. The Tip of the Mitt AVA was established in August 2016. The major wine trail in the area, The 'Petoskey Area Wine Region', was formerly known as 'The Bay View Wine Trail'.

Detail
The Tip of the Mitt AVA was created by the U.S. Alcohol and Tobacco Tax and Trade Bureau by petition from the Straits Area Grape Growers Association. The petition to create the AVA noted that the area was suited for the cultivation of cold-weather varietals such as Marquette and Frontenac. The Straits Area Grape Growers Association has announced its intent to specialize in cold-hardy vines.

References

American Viticultural Areas
Michigan wine
2016 establishments in Michigan